The Little Schuylkill Navigation, Railroad and Coal Company (LSRR) was a railway company in the U.S. state of Pennsylvania in the 19th century.

History
The railroad received a charter from the Commonwealth of Pennsylvania on February 28, 1826. Construction began in 1830. The tracks were constructed with strap iron on wood rails. Beginning with horse-drawn cars in 1831, the LSRR operated between Tamaqua, located at the end of the coal-rich Panther Creek Valley and the Port Clinton terminus of the Schuylkill Canal. It later made a rail junction with the Philadelphia and Reading Railway Company.

In 1833, the railroad acquired two steam locomotives, built in Liverpool, but the wooden tracks did not support the engines, requiring a resumption of animal-powered operations. This over-extended investment nearly bankrupted the young company. Only in 1845 did iron "T" rails replace the wooden rails, allowing the costly English locomotives to return to regular service.

In 1854, the LSRR completed a junction with the Catawissa Railroad at Tamanend (also called Little Schuylkill Junction). In 1857, it built a roundhouse in Tamaqua, housing 21 locomotives and a turntable. 

In 1863, the company was leased by the Reading Railroad for 93 years. It formally merged with the Reading in 1952.

See also 

 List of Pennsylvania railroads

References 

Defunct Pennsylvania railroads
Transportation in Schuylkill County, Pennsylvania
Predecessors of the Reading Company
Railway companies established in 1826
Railway lines opened in 1831
Railway companies disestablished in 1952
1826 establishments in Pennsylvania
American companies established in 1826
American companies disestablished in 1952